Berkshire Mall is an enclosed shopping mall in Wyomissing, Pennsylvania, a suburb to the west of Reading in Berks County. Berkshire Mall is accessible from US 222/US 422 (Warren Street Bypass) at the Paper Mill Road interchange or the State Hill Road interchange. The main entrances to the mall are located along Woodland Road or State Hill Road.  The mall first opened in February 1970. The mall's only anchor store is Boscov's, with two vacant anchor spaces.

History

Planning for the mall began in the late 1960s.  Sears was announced to be the first major planned tenant in November 1967, to replace its nearby Shillington location which had opened in 1956.  Construction got underway in 1968, with an "official" kickoff in November of that year.  The mall opened in February 1970, and was the first enclosed shopping mall to open in eastern Pennsylvania outside of the Philadelphia area.

The mall's name is taken from the source of the name of Berks County, an abbreviation of the English royal county Berkshire. The old fountain in the center of the mall had been choreographed by local Reading company "Symphonic Fountains". An upper level food court, The Terrace Cafe, held its grand opening December 7–10, 1989. It replaced a Victorian themed mini-mall known simply as "Lamp Post Lane".

The original owner and developer of the mall was the Goodman Company, which sold the property to Equitable Real Estate Management in 1985.  In July 2002, the mall was acquired by Allied Properties.

In January 2002, Boscov's purchased the Strawbridge's store, originally a Wanamaker's until 1995 and later Hecht's until 1996, at Berkshire Mall; the Boscov's store at Berkshire Mall opened in August 2002. The Boscov's store at Berkshire Mall replaced the Boscov's West store in Sinking Spring, which opened in November 1962.

On the night of November 2, 2009, a fire broke out in a display window of the Victoria's Secret store. Before firefighters could arrive, the sprinkler system activated in the store and the adjacent hallway. The store suffered smoke and water damage; everyone was evacuated safely without any reported injuries. On April 14, 2010, there was a fire inside of Boscov's. A worker was flown to Lehigh Valley Hospital–Cedar Crest in Allentown for severe burns to the face. Firefighters had controlled the fire in 30 minutes.

On January 12, 2011 at 4:20 PM according to leaked security footage, a mall patron fell head first into the fountain in the Boscov's court due to being distracted because she was walking and text messaging at the same time. Days later the video uploaded to YouTube with titles such as "Girl Falls In Mall Fountain While Texting" went viral and received international news coverage. As a result of this incident, the security guard who posted the video was fired.

On May 22, 2014, the mall was hit by an unusually severe spring thunderstorm. Golf ball-sized hail ripped through the ceiling causing interior damage by shattering skylights which left glass and debris covering walkways, plants and the fountain in the Sears court, while cars were dented and windshields smashed in the parking lot.

The Bon-Ton store, originally a Lit Brothers until 1976 and later a Pomeroy's until 1987, at Berkshire Mall closed on August 28, 2018 as part of that chain's liquidation. On November 8, 2018, it was announced the Sears store at Berkshire Mall would close in February 2019 as part of a plan to close 40 stores nationwide, leaving Boscov's as the only anchor store.

In July 2020, Allied Properties sold Berkshire Mall to Namdar Realty Group.

Berkshire Mall West

Berkshire Mall West is a strip plaza across Woodland Road from Berkshire Mall.  The "mall west" contains a Fine Wine & Good Spirits Premium Collection store, One Stop Beverage, TJ Maxx, Outback Steakhouse, Customers Bank, and Boot Barn. There was a Circuit City until 2009, which closed after the chain folded. The newly-vacant space served as a Halloween Adventure for the 2009 season, before reopening as an H. H. Gregg in 2010. H. H. Gregg closed in 2017 after the chain folded; the building remained vacant until 2021, when it became a Burlington store, the chain's second in Berks County. There was also an A.C. Moore until that chain went out of business in 2020.

In popular culture
The mall is featured in the 2021 novel, Black-Haired Boy, in which the main protagonist, Kieran Northrup, visits the mall to purchase a CD by the fictional band, Stay Sweet at FYE. The novel takes place in 2006 and long-since closed stores are mentioned including the former Sears and The Bon-Ton.

References

External links

 Official website

Shopping malls in Pennsylvania
Shopping malls established in 1970
Tourist attractions in Berks County, Pennsylvania
Buildings and structures in Berks County, Pennsylvania
Namdar Realty Group